The Suzuki A80 is a , two-stroke motorcycle manufactured by Suzuki during the 1970s. The A80 which succeeded the A70 was basically an A100 with a smaller capacity engine. The motorcycle came into the market just before the fuel crisis of 1973. It has autolube system which omitted the need for premixing of two-stroke oil with gasoline.

A80
Two-stroke motorcycles
Motorcycles introduced in the 1970s